The 2016 Euro RX of Portugal was the first round of the forty-first season of the FIA European Rallycross Championship. The event was held at the Pista Automóvel de Montalegre in Montalegre, Vila Real, and was contested by the Super1600 class.

Super1600

Heats

Semi-finals
Semi-Final 1

Semi-Final 2

Final

Standings after the event
Super1600 standings

References

External links

|- style="text-align:center"
|width="35%"|Previous race:2015 Euro RX of Italy
|width="40%"|FIA European Rallycross Championship2016 season
|width="35%"|Next race:2016 Euro RX of Belgium

Portugal
Euro RX